Tiffany D. Cross (born February 6, 1979) is an American television personality, political analyst, and author. From 2020 to 2022, she was the host of The Cross Connection, a Saturday morning MSNBC show.

Early life and education
Cross was born in Ohio. While growing up she moved between Cleveland, Ohio, and Atlanta, Georgia. When she was a teenager, she wanted to be the "brown Murphy Brown". During this time, Cross was also a huge fan of Oprah and has claimed to never miss an episode of her show. Growing up, her mother would often take her to the public library, where she found a love for reading and writing.

Cross attended, but did not graduate from Clark Atlanta University, where she majored in mass communications with an emphasis on radio, television, and film.

Career
Cross has spent over 20 years working with media and politics, covering local, state, and federal campaigns and elections, as well as Washington D.C. politics. Her first journalism job was as a reporter at an Atlanta radio station, and she later worked for CNN as an associate producer in the early 2000s. Cross was also the Washington, D.C., bureau chief for BET Networks and later became a resident fellow at the Harvard Kennedy School Institute of Politics. She has been a regular guest on MSNBC programs, most notably AM Joy, and in July 2020 she became one of the show's rotating guess hosts. Cross has also served as the managing editor of The Beat DC.

As of August, Cross, Jonathan Capehart and Zerlina Maxwell were being considered for the weekend slot by MSNBC. In December, Cross was named host of a new two-hour show on MSNBC, Cross Connection (often stylized as Crosstalk), replacing Reid's AM Joy Saturday slot, with Capehart taking the Sunday slot and Maxwell hosting her own show on NBC Peacock.

In October 2022, Cross generated controversy over Miami Dolphins quarterback Tua Tagovailoa's recent concussions. During her October 8 broadcast, Cross said the Tagovailoa's treatment showed that white NFL coaches fail to protect "Black bodies." In fact, the Dolphins' head coach, Mike McDaniel, is biracial and Tagovailoa is of Samoan descent.

On November 4, 2022, MSNBC informed her production staff that Cross's contract would not be renewed. Variety reported that "executives at the network [were] growing concerned about the anchor’s willingness to address statements made by cable-news hosts on other networks and indulging in commentary executives felt did not meet the standards of MSNBC or NBC News", while Black Enterprise linked the decision to Cross saying on a Comedy Central show just hours before that "Florida literally looks like the d--k of the country, so let's get rid of Florida" and "Let's castrate Florida".

In response to the cancellation, Cross stated, "I am disheartened to learn of MSNBC's decision to cancel my show, The Cross Connection, at such a crucial time — four days before the midterm elections... With a rapidly changing media landscape, I look forward to maintaining a platform that continues to reflect the changing demographics of the country."

Works
Say It Louder!: Black Voters, Our Voices, and the Shaping of American Democracy. New York: Amistad (2020).

References

External links

1979 births
21st-century American journalists
21st-century American non-fiction writers
21st-century American women writers
African-American journalists
African-American television hosts
African-American women writers
American political journalists
American women non-fiction writers
American women television journalists
American women television presenters
BET Networks
Clark Atlanta University alumni
Journalists from Georgia (U.S. state)
Journalists from Ohio
Journalists from Washington, D.C.
Living people
MSNBC people
Writers from Atlanta